Hong Kong Democracy Council (HKDC) is a Washington, DC-based nonpartisan, non-governmental organization (NGO) with a stated mission of "protect[ing] Hong Kong’s basic freedoms, autonomy, and the rule of law." HKDC's research and political work focuses on "educational outreach, community empowerment, and policy advocacy."

History 
HKDC was founded amid the 2019 Hong Kong protests as a platform for diasporic Hong Kongers in the United States to advocate for Hong Kong's democratic development and draw attention to related human rights issues. Founding members of HKDC included Nathan Law, a former Hong Kong Legislative Councilor, Victoria Tin-bor Hui, a professor of political science at the University of Notre Dame, and the Hong Kong organizers Anna Yeung-Cheung and Joseph Ng.

In September 2021, Brian Leung Kai-ping became executive director of HKDC. Alex Chow Yong-kang became board chair.

Advocacy work 
Since its launch, HKDC has advocated for the passage of the Hong Kong Human Rights and Democracy Act, PROTECT Hong Kong Act and Hong Kong Autonomy Act, economic sanctions and visa bans on Chinese and Hong Kong officials undermining Hong Kong's autonomy and human rights, and additional legislation in Congress including immigration and refugee protection for Hong Kongers. HKDC's staff, board members, and advisors have also testified in front of the United States Congress.

Hong Kong-related legislation 
HKDC has issued statements & briefing documents in support of the Hong Kong Human Rights and Democracy Act, the PROTECT Hong Kong Act, and the Hong Kong Autonomy Act, as well as various iterations of the broad-based Hong Kong People's Freedom and Choice Act and the immigration-focused Hong Kong Safe Harbor Act.

2021 escape of five Hong Kong fugitives 
In January 2021, HKDC assisted in the rescue of five Hong Kong protesters by sponsoring the first set of humanitarian parole visas to the US. The five men, age 18–26, fled by boat to Taiwan in July 2020, soon after China imposed the Hong Kong national security law on June 30, 2020.

Response by Chinese government 
Chinese authorities imposed sanctions on HKDC and others in July 2021, in response to the implementation of U.S. sanctions on Chinese and Hong Kong officials advocated for by HKDC.

Research 
HKDC maintains a research team, which publishes reports on digital authoritarianism, political persecution, and other human rights issues in Hong Kong.

Political prisoners in Hong Kong 
HKDC maintains a publicly available database of political prisoners in Hong Kong, tracking politically motivated arrests made under the National Security Law as well as existing statutes concerning unlawful assembly, incitement, and rioting. According to HKDC, there are 1,163 political prisoners in Hong Kong as of September 2022.

Data privacy in Hong Kong 
In collaboration with the Open Technology Fund and cybersecurity research firm 7ASecurity, HKDC conducted a penetration test and privacy audit of the Hong Kong government's LeaveHomeSafe COVID-19 contact tracing app. The report found a number of major vulnerabilities in the LeaveHomeSafe app, contradicting claims by the Hong Kong government that the app had been previously audited to address concerns over users' data privacy.

Global Financial Leaders' Investment Summit 
On 25 October 2022, HKDC released a report titled "Business Not As Usual," which criticized executives going to the Global Financial Leaders' Investment Summit (GFLIS) and stating that global finance leaders attending the summit would be "lending credibility not only to the government's whitewashing campaign, but also to Beijing's handpicked Chief Executive of Hong Kong, John Lee, who is scheduled to open the GFLIS with 'welcoming remarks.'" On the same day, HKDC launched a database tracking international companies' cooperation with the Hong Kong government. Hours after the report and database were published, the Hong Kong government blocked portions of HKDC's website on some of Hong Kong's major mobile networks and internet service providers. In response, an HKDC spokesperson said: "HKDC condemns the Hong Kong government's concerted efforts to erode internet freedom, among the many freedoms Hongkongers have been stripped of over the past years."

Community engagement 
HKDC has stated an interest in serving as a diaspora-building organization for Hong Kong immigrants and refugees in the United States. In the past, HKDC has funded a number of Hong Kong diaspora-related events and business projects.

Revolution of Our Times screening tour 
In 2021 and 2022, HKDC hosted a 20-city nationwide screening tour for the film Revolution of Our Times, a 2021 documentary about the 2019-2020 Hong Kong protests.

Hong Kong Summit 
In July 2022, HKDC partnered with Stand With Hong Kong to host a 3-day summit of Hong Kong diaspora activists, human rights researchers, and China policy experts.

See also
 Diaspora politics in the United States
 Hong Kong
 Democratic development in Hong Kong
 Hong Kong Human Rights and Democracy Act
 Hong Kong Autonomy Act
 Magnitsky Act
 Nathan Law
 Alex Chow
 Sunny Cheung

References

External links
 

501(c)(3) organizations
Charities based in Washington, D.C.
Foreign policy political advocacy groups in the United States
Hong Kong
2014 Hong Kong protests
2019–2020 Hong Kong protests
Human rights
Organizations established in 2019
Political organizations based in the United States